Attachment theory is a psychological, evolutionary and ethological theory concerning relationships between humans. The most important tenet is that young children need to develop a relationship with at least one primary caregiver for normal social and emotional development. The theory was formulated by psychiatrist and psychoanalyst John Bowlby.

Within attachment theory, infant behaviour associated with attachment is primarily the seeking of proximity to an attachment figure in stressful situations. Infants become attached to adults who are sensitive and responsive in social interactions with them, and who remain as consistent caregivers for some months during the period from about six months to two years of age. During the latter part of this period, children begin to use attachment figures (familiar people) as a secure base to explore from and return to. Parental responses lead to the development of patterns of attachment; these, in turn, lead to internal working models which will guide the individual's feelings, thoughts and expectations in later relationships. Separation anxiety or grief following the loss of an attachment figure is considered to be a normal and adaptive response for an attached infant. These behaviours may have evolved because they increase the probability of survival of the child.

Research by developmental psychologist Mary Ainsworth in the 1960s and 70s underpinned the basic concepts, introduced the concept of the "secure base" and developed a theory of a number of attachment patterns in infants: secure attachment, avoidant attachment and anxious attachment. A fourth pattern, disorganized attachment, was identified later. In the 1980s, the theory was extended to attachments in adults. Other interactions may be construed as including components of attachment behaviour; these include peer relationships at all ages, romantic and sexual attraction and responses to the care needs of infants or the sick and elderly.

To formulate a comprehensive theory of the nature of early attachments, Bowlby explored a range of fields, including evolutionary biology, object relations theory (a school of psychoanalysis), control systems theory, and the fields of ethology and cognitive psychology. After preliminary papers from 1958 onwards, Bowlby published the full theory in the trilogy Attachment and Loss (1969–82). In the early days of the theory, academic psychologists criticized Bowlby, and the psychoanalytic community ostracized him for his departure from psychoanalytical doctrines; however, attachment theory has since become the dominant approach to understanding early social development, and has given rise to a great surge of empirical research into the formation of children's close relationships. Later criticisms of attachment theory relate to temperament, the complexity of social relationships, and the limitations of discrete patterns for classifications. Attachment theory has been significantly modified as a result of empirical research, but the concepts have become generally accepted. Attachment theory has formed the basis of new therapies and informed existing ones, and its concepts have been used in the formulation of social and childcare policies to support the early attachment relationships of children.

Attachment

Within attachment theory, attachment means an affectional bond or tie between an individual and an attachment figure (usually a caregiver). Such bonds may be reciprocal between two adults, but between a child and a caregiver, these bonds are based on the child's need for safety, security, and protection — which is most important in infancy and childhood. Attachment theory is not an exhaustive description of human relationships, nor is it synonymous with love and affection, although these may indicate that bonds exist. In child-to-adult relationships, the child's tie is called the "attachment" and the caregiver's reciprocal equivalent is referred to as the "care-giving bond". The theory proposes that children attach to carers instinctively, for the purpose of survival and, ultimately, genetic replication. The biological aim is survival and the psychological aim is security. The relationship that a child has with their attachment figure is especially important in threatening situations. Having access to a secure figure decreases fear in children when they are presented with threatening situations. Not only is having a decreased level of fear important for general mental stability, but it also implicates how children might react to threatening situations. The presence of a supportive attachment figure is especially important in a child's developmental years.

Infants will form attachments to any consistent caregiver who is sensitive and responsive in social interactions with them. The quality of social engagement is more influential than the amount of time spent. The biological mother is the usual principal attachment figure, but the role can be taken by anyone who consistently behaves in a "mothering" way over a period of time. Within attachment theory, this means a set of behaviours that involves engaging in lively social interaction with the infant and responding readily to signals and approaches. Nothing in the theory suggests that fathers are not equally likely to become principal attachment figures if they provide most of the child care and related social interaction. A secure attachment with to a father who is a "secondary attachment figure" may also a counter the possible negative affects of an unsatisfactory attachment to a mother who is the primary attachment figure.

Some infants direct attachment behaviour (proximity seeking) towards more than one attachment figure almost as soon as they start to show discrimination between caregivers; most come to do so during their second year. These figures are arranged hierarchically, with the principal attachment figure at the top. The set-goal of the attachment behavioural system is to maintain a bond with an accessible and available attachment figure. "Alarm" is the term used for activation of the attachment behavioural system caused by fear of danger. "Anxiety" is the anticipation or fear of being cut off from the attachment figure. If the figure is unavailable or unresponsive, separation distress occurs. In infants, physical separation can cause anxiety and anger, followed by sadness and despair. By age three or four, physical separation is no longer such a threat to the child's bond with the attachment figure. Threats to security in older children and adults arise from prolonged absence, breakdowns in communication, emotional unavailability or signs of rejection or abandonment.

Behaviours

The attachment behavioural system serves to achieve or maintain proximity to the attachment figure.

Pre-attachment behaviours occur in the first six months of life. During the first phase (the first eight weeks), infants smile, babble, and cry to attract the attention of potential caregivers. Although infants of this age learn to discriminate between caregivers, these behaviours are directed at anyone in the vicinity.

During the second phase (two to six months), the infant discriminates between familiar and unfamiliar adults, becoming more responsive toward the caregiver; following and clinging are added to the range of behaviours. The infant's behaviour toward the caregiver becomes organized on a goal-directed basis to achieve the conditions that make it feel secure.

By the end of the first year, the infant is able to display a range of attachment behaviours designed to maintain proximity. These manifest as protesting the caregiver's departure, greeting the caregiver's return, clinging when frightened, and following when able.

With the development of locomotion, the infant begins to use the caregiver or caregivers as a "safe base" from which to explore. Infant exploration is greater when the caregiver is present because the infant's attachment system is relaxed and it is free to explore. If the caregiver is inaccessible or unresponsive, attachment behaviour is more strongly exhibited. Anxiety, fear, illness, and fatigue will cause a child to increase attachment behaviours.

After the second year, as the child begins to see the caregiver as an independent person, a more complex and goal-corrected partnership is formed. Children begin to notice others' goals and feelings and plan their actions accordingly.

Tenets
Modern attachment theory is based on three principles:  
 Bonding is an intrinsic human need. 
 Regulation of emotion and fear to enhance vitality.
 Promoting adaptiveness and growth. 
Common attachment behaviours and emotions, displayed in most social primates including humans, are adaptive. The long-term evolution of these species has involved selection for social behaviours that make individual or group survival more likely. The commonly observed attachment behaviour of toddlers staying near familiar people would have had safety advantages in the environment of early adaptation and has similar advantages today. Bowlby saw the environment of early adaptation as similar to current hunter-gatherer societies. There is a survival advantage in the capacity to sense possibly dangerous conditions such as unfamiliarity, being alone, or rapid approach. According to Bowlby, proximity-seeking to the attachment figure in the face of threat is the "set-goal" of the attachment behavioural system.

Bowlby's original account of a sensitivity period during which attachments can form of between six months and two to three years has been modified by later researchers. These researchers have shown there is indeed a sensitive period during which attachments will form if possible, but the time frame is broader and the effect less fixed and irreversible than first proposed.

With further research, authors discussing attachment theory have come to appreciate social development is affected by later as well as earlier relationships. Early steps in attachment take place most easily if the infant has one caregiver, or the occasional care of a small number of other people. According to Bowlby, almost from the beginning, many children have more than one figure toward whom they direct attachment behaviour. These figures are not treated alike; there is a strong bias for a child to direct attachment behaviour mainly toward one particular person. Bowlby used the term "monotropy" to describe this bias. Researchers and theorists have abandoned this concept insofar as it may be taken to mean the relationship with the special figure differs qualitatively from that of other figures. Rather, current thinking postulates definite hierarchies of relationships.

Early experiences with caregivers gradually give rise to a system of thoughts, memories, beliefs, expectations, emotions, and behaviours about the self and others. This system, called the "internal working model of social relationships", continues to develop with time and experience.

Internal models regulate, interpret, and predict attachment-related behaviour in the self and the attachment figure. As they develop in line with environmental and developmental changes, they incorporate the capacity to reflect and communicate about past and future attachment relationships. They enable the child to handle new types of social interactions; knowing, for example, an infant should be treated differently from an older child, or that interactions with teachers and parents share characteristics. Even interaction with coaches share similar characteristics, as athletes who secure attachment relationships with not only their parents but their coaches will play a role in the growth of athletes in their prospective sport. This internal working model continues to develop through adulthood, helping cope with friendships, marriage, and parenthood, all of which involve different behaviours and feelings.

The development of attachment is a transactional process. Specific attachment behaviours begin with predictable, apparently innate, behaviours in infancy. They change with age in ways determined partly by experiences and partly by situational factors. As attachment behaviours change with age, they do so in ways shaped by relationships. A child's behaviour when reunited with a caregiver is determined not only by how the caregiver has treated the child before, but on the history of effects the child has had on the caregiver.

Cultural differences 
In Western culture child-rearing, there is a focus on single attachment to primarily the mother. This dyadic model is not the only strategy of attachment producing a secure and emotionally adept child. Having a single, dependably responsive and sensitive caregiver (namely the mother) does not guarantee the ultimate success of the child. Results from Israeli, Dutch and east African studies show children with multiple caregivers grow up not only feeling secure, but developed "more enhanced capacities to view the world from multiple perspectives." This evidence can be more readily found in hunter-gatherer communities, like those that exist in rural Tanzania.

In hunter-gatherer communities, in the past and present, mothers are the primary caregivers but share the maternal responsibility of ensuring the child's survival with a variety of different allomothers. So while the mother is important, she is not the only opportunity for relational attachment a child can make. Several group members (with or without blood relation) contribute to the task of bringing up a child, sharing the parenting role and therefore can be sources of multiple attachment. There is evidence of this communal parenting throughout history that "would have significant implications for the evolution of multiple attachment."

In "non-metropolis" India (where "dual income nuclear families" are more the norm and dyadic mother relationship is), where a family normally consists of 3 generations (and if lucky 4: great-grandparents, grandparents, parents, and child or children), the child or children by default have four to six caregivers from whom to select their "attachment figure". And a child's "uncles and aunts" (father's siblings and their spouses) also contribute to the child's psycho-social enrichment.

Although it has been debated for years, and there are differences across cultures, research has shown that the three basic aspects of attachment theory are, to some degree, universal. Studies in Israel and Japan resulted in findings which diverge from a number of studies completed in Western Europe and the United States.  The prevailing hypotheses are: 1) that secure attachment is the most desirable state, and the most prevalent; 2) maternal sensitivity influences infant attachment patterns; and 3) specific infant attachments predict later social and cognitive competence.

Attachment patterns

"The strength of a child's attachment behaviour in a given circumstance does not indicate the 'strength' of the attachment bond. Some insecure children will routinely display very pronounced attachment behaviours, while many secure children find that there is no great need to engage in either intense or frequent shows of attachment behaviour." "Individuals with different attachment styles have different beliefs about romantic love period, availability, trust capability of love partners and love readiness."

Secure attachment

A toddler who is securely attached to his or her parent (or other familiar caregiver) will explore freely while the caregiver is present, typically engages with strangers, is often visibly upset when the caregiver departs, and is generally happy to see the caregiver return. The extent of exploration and of distress are affected, however, by the child's temperamental make-up and by situational factors as well as by attachment status. A child's attachment is largely influenced by their primary caregiver's sensitivity to their needs. Parents who consistently (or almost always) respond to their child's needs will create securely attached children. Such children are certain that their parents will be responsive to their needs and communications.

In the traditional Ainsworth et al. (1978) coding of the Strange Situation, secure infants are denoted as "Group B" infants and they are further subclassified as B1, B2, B3, and B4. Although these subgroupings refer to different stylistic responses to the comings and goings of the caregiver, they were not given specific labels by Ainsworth and colleagues, although their descriptive behaviours led others (including students of Ainsworth) to devise a relatively "loose" terminology for these subgroups. B1's have been referred to as "secure-reserved", B2's as "secure-inhibited", B3's as "secure-balanced", and B4's as "secure-reactive". However, in academic publications the classification of infants (if subgroups are denoted) is typically simply "B1" or "B2", although more theoretical and review-oriented papers surrounding attachment theory may use the above terminology. Secure attachment is the most common type of attachment relationship seen throughout societies.

Securely attached children are best able to explore when they have the knowledge of a secure base (their caregiver) to return to in times of need. When assistance is given, this bolsters the sense of security and also, assuming the parent's assistance is helpful, educates the child on how to cope with the same problem in the future. Therefore, secure attachment can be seen as the most adaptive attachment style. According to some psychological researchers, a child becomes securely attached when the parent is available and able to meet the needs of the child in a responsive and appropriate manner. At infancy and early childhood, if parents are caring and attentive towards their children, those children will be more prone to secure attachment.

Anxious-ambivalent attachment
Anxious-ambivalent attachment is a form of insecure attachment and is also misnamed as "resistant attachment". In general, a child with an anxious-ambivalent pattern of attachment will typically explore little (in the Strange Situation) and is often wary of strangers, even when the parent is present. When the caregiver departs, the child is often highly distressed showing behaviours such as crying or screaming. The child is generally ambivalent when the caregiver returns. The anxious-ambivalent strategy is a response to unpredictably responsive caregiving, and the displays of anger (ambivalent resistant, C1) or helplessness (ambivalent passive, C2) towards the caregiver on reunion can be regarded as a conditional strategy for maintaining the availability of the caregiver by preemptively taking control of the interaction.

The C1 (ambivalent resistant) subtype is coded when "resistant behavior is particularly conspicuous. The mixture of seeking and yet resisting contact and interaction has an unmistakably angry quality and indeed an angry tone may characterize behavior in the preseparation episodes".

Regarding the C2 (ambivalent passive) subtype, Ainsworth et al. wrote:

Research done by McCarthy and Taylor (1999) found that children with abusive childhood experiences were more likely to develop ambivalent attachments. The study also found that children with ambivalent attachments were more likely to experience difficulties in maintaining intimate relationships as adults.

Anxious-avoidant and dismissive-avoidant attachment

An infant with an anxious-avoidant pattern of attachment will avoid or ignore the caregiver—showing little emotion when the caregiver departs or returns. The infant will not explore very much regardless of who is there. Infants classified as anxious-avoidant (A) represented a puzzle in the early 1970s. They did not exhibit distress on separation, and either ignored the caregiver on their return (A1 subtype) or showed some tendency to approach together with some tendency to ignore or turn away from the caregiver (A2 subtype). Ainsworth and Bell theorized that the apparently unruffled behaviour of the avoidant infants was in fact a mask for distress, a hypothesis later evidenced through studies of the heart-rate of avoidant infants.

Infants are depicted as anxious-avoidant when there is:

Ainsworth's narrative records showed that infants avoided the caregiver in the stressful Strange Situation Procedure when they had a history of experiencing rebuff of attachment behaviour. The infant's needs were frequently not met and the infant had come to believe that communication of emotional needs had no influence on the caregiver.

Ainsworth's student Mary Main theorized that avoidant behaviour in the Strange Situation Procedure should be regarded as "a conditional strategy, which paradoxically permits whatever proximity is possible under conditions of maternal rejection" by de-emphasising attachment needs.

Main proposed that avoidance has two functions for an infant whose caregiver is consistently unresponsive to their needs. Firstly, avoidant behaviour allows the infant to maintain a conditional proximity with the caregiver: close enough to maintain protection, but distant enough to avoid rebuff. Secondly, the cognitive processes organising avoidant behaviour could help direct attention away from the unfulfilled desire for closeness with the caregiver—avoiding a situation in which the child is overwhelmed with emotion ("disorganized distress"), and therefore unable to maintain control of themselves and achieve even conditional proximity.

Disorganized/disoriented attachment
Beginning in 1983, Crittenden offered A/C and other new organized classifications (see below). Drawing on records of behaviours discrepant with the A, B and C classifications, a fourth classification was added by Ainsworth's colleague Mary Main. In the Strange Situation, the attachment system is expected to be activated by the departure and return of the caregiver. If the behaviour of the infant does not appear to the observer to be coordinated in a smooth way across episodes to achieve either proximity or some relative proximity with the caregiver, then it is considered 'disorganized' as it indicates a disruption or flooding of the attachment system (e.g. by fear). Infant behaviours in the Strange Situation Protocol coded as disorganized/disoriented include overt displays of fear; contradictory behaviours or affects occurring simultaneously or sequentially; stereotypic, asymmetric, misdirected or jerky movements; or freezing and apparent dissociation. Lyons-Ruth has urged, however, that it should be more widely "recognized that 52% of disorganized infants continue to approach the caregiver, seek comfort, and cease their distress without clear ambivalent or avoidant behavior".

The benefit of this category was hinted at earlier in Ainsworth's own experience finding difficulties in fitting all infant behaviour into the three classifications used in her Baltimore study. Ainsworth and colleagues sometimes observed "tense movements such as hunching the shoulders, putting the hands behind the neck and tensely cocking the head, and so on. It was our clear impression that such tension movements signified stress, both because they tended to occur chiefly in the separation episodes and because they tended to be prodromal to crying. Indeed, our hypothesis is that they occur when a child is attempting to control crying, for they tend to vanish if and when crying breaks through." Such observations also appeared in the doctoral theses of Ainsworth's students. Crittenden, for example, noted that one abused infant in her doctoral sample was classed as secure (B) by her undergraduate coders because her strange situation behaviour was "without either avoidance or ambivalence, she did show stress-related stereotypic headcocking throughout the strange situation. This pervasive behavior, however, was the only clue to the extent of her stress".

There is rapidly growing interest in disorganized attachment from clinicians and policy-makers as well as researchers. However, the disorganized/disoriented attachment (D) classification has been criticized by some for being too encompassing, including Ainsworth herself. In 1990, Ainsworth put in print her blessing for the new 'D' classification, though she urged that the addition be regarded as "open-ended, in the sense that subcategories may be distinguished", as she worried that too many different forms of behaviour might be treated as if they were the same thing. Indeed, the D classification puts together infants who use a somewhat disrupted secure (B) strategy with those who seem hopeless and show little attachment behaviour; it also puts together infants who run to hide when they see their caregiver in the same classification as those who show an avoidant (A) strategy on the first reunion and then an ambivalent-resistant (C) strategy on the second reunion. Perhaps responding to such concerns, George and Solomon have divided among indices of disorganized/disoriented attachment (D) in the Strange Situation, treating some of the behaviours as a 'strategy of desperation' and others as evidence that the attachment system has been flooded (e.g. by fear, or anger).

Crittenden also argues that some behaviour classified as Disorganized/disoriented can be regarded as more 'emergency' versions of the avoidant and/or ambivalent/resistant strategies, and function to maintain the protective availability of the caregiver to some degree. Sroufe et al. have agreed that "even disorganized attachment behaviour (simultaneous approach-avoidance; freezing, etc.) enables a degree of proximity in the face of a frightening or unfathomable parent". However, "the presumption that many indices of 'disorganization' are aspects of organized patterns does not preclude acceptance of the notion of disorganization, especially in cases where the complexity and dangerousness of the threat are beyond children's capacity for response." For example, "Children placed in care, especially more than once, often have intrusions. In videos of the Strange Situation Procedure, they tend to occur when a rejected/neglected child approaches the stranger in an intrusion of desire for comfort, then loses muscular control and falls to the floor, overwhelmed by the intruding fear of the unknown, potentially dangerous, strange person."

Main and Hesse found most of the mothers of these children had suffered major losses or other trauma shortly before or after the birth of the infant and had reacted by becoming severely depressed. In fact, fifty-six per cent of mothers who had lost a parent by death before they completed high school had children with disorganized attachments. Subsequent studies, whilst emphasising the potential importance of unresolved loss, have qualified these findings. For example, Solomon and George found unresolved loss in the mother tended to be associated with disorganized attachment in their infant primarily when they had also experienced an unresolved trauma in their life prior to the loss.

Categorization differences across cultures 
Across different cultures deviations from the Strange Situation Protocol have been observed.  A Japanese study in 1986 (Takahashi) studied 60 Japanese mother-infant pairs and compared them with Ainsworth's distributional pattern. Although the ranges for securely attached and insecurely attached had no significant differences in proportions, the Japanese insecure group consisted of only resistant children, with no children categorized as avoidant.  This may be because the Japanese child rearing philosophy stressed close mother infant bonds more so than in Western cultures.  In Northern Germany, Grossmann et al. (Grossmann, Huber, & Wartner, 1981; Grossmann, Spangler, Suess, & Unzner, 1985) replicated the Ainsworth Strange Situation with 46 mother infant pairs and found a different distribution of attachment classifications with a high number of avoidant infants: 52% avoidant, 34% secure, and 13% resistant (Grossmann et al., 1985).  Another study in Israel found there was a high frequency of an ambivalent pattern, which according to Grossman et al. (1985) could be attributed to a greater parental push toward children's independence.

Later patterns and the dynamic-maturational model 
Techniques have been developed to allow verbal ascertainment of the child's state of mind with respect to attachment. An example is the "stem story", in which a child is given the beginning of a story that raises attachment issues and asked to complete it. For older children, adolescents and adults, semi-structured interviews are used in which the manner of relaying content may be as significant as the content itself. However, there are no substantially validated measures of attachment for middle childhood or early adolescence (approximately 7 to 13 years of age).

Some studies of older children have identified further attachment classifications. Main and Cassidy observed that disorganized behaviour in infancy can develop into a child using caregiving-controlling or punitive behaviour in order to manage a helpless or dangerously unpredictable caregiver. In these cases, the child's behaviour is organized, but the behaviour is treated by researchers as a form of 'disorganization' (D) since the hierarchy in the family is no longer organized according to parenting authority.

American psychologist Patricia McKinsey Crittenden has elaborated classifications of further forms of avoidant and ambivalent attachment behaviour, as seen in her dynamic-maturational model of attachment and adaptation (DMM). These include the caregiving and punitive behaviours also identified by Main and Cassidy (termed A3 and C3 respectively), but also other patterns such as compulsive compliance with the wishes of a threatening parent (A4).

Crittenden's ideas developed from Bowlby's proposal that "given certain adverse circumstances during childhood, the selective exclusion of information of certain sorts may be adaptive. Yet, when during adolescence and adulthood the situation changes, the persistent exclusion of the same forms of information may become maladaptive".

Crittenden proposed that the basic components of human experience of danger are two kinds of information:

 'Affective information' – the emotions provoked by the potential for danger, such as anger or fear. Crittenden terms this "affective information". In childhood this information would include emotions provoked by the unexplained absence of an attachment figure. Where an infant is faced with insensitive or rejecting parenting, one strategy for maintaining the availability of their attachment figure is to try to exclude from consciousness or from expressed behaviour any emotional information that might result in rejection.
 Causal or other sequentially ordered knowledge about the potential for safety or danger. In childhood this would include knowledge regarding the behaviours that indicate an attachment figure's availability as a secure haven. If knowledge regarding the behaviours that indicate an attachment figure's availability as a secure haven is subject to segregation, then the infant can try to keep the attention of their caregiver through clingy or aggressive behaviour, or alternating combinations of the two. Such behaviour may increase the availability of an attachment figure who otherwise displays inconsistent or misleading responses to the infant's attachment behaviours, suggesting the unreliability of protection and safety.

Crittenden proposes that both kinds of information can be split off from consciousness or behavioural expression as a 'strategy' to maintain the availability of an attachment figure (See section above on Disorganized/disoriented attachment for distinction of "Types"): "Type A strategies were hypothesized to be based on reducing perception of threat to reduce the disposition to respond. Type C was hypothesized to be based on heightening perception of threat to increase the disposition to respond." Type A strategies split off emotional information about feeling threatened and type C strategies split off temporally-sequenced knowledge about how and why the attachment figure is available. By contrast, type B strategies effectively utilize both kinds of information without much distortion. For example: a toddler may have come to depend upon a type C strategy of tantrums in working to maintain the availability of an attachment figure whose inconsistent availability has led the child to distrust or distort causal information about their apparent behaviour. This may lead their attachment figure to get a clearer grasp on their needs and the appropriate response to their attachment behaviours. Experiencing more reliable and predictable information about the availability of their attachment figure, the toddler then no longer needs to use coercive behaviours with the goal of maintaining their caregiver's availability and can develop a secure attachment to their caregiver since they trust that their needs and communications will be heeded.

Significance of patterns
Research based on data from longitudinal studies, such as the National Institute of Child Health and Human Development Study of Early Child Care and the Minnesota Study of Risk and Adaption from Birth to Adulthood, and from cross-sectional studies, consistently shows associations between early attachment classifications and peer relationships as to both quantity and quality. Lyons-Ruth, for example, found that "for each additional withdrawing behavior displayed by mothers in relation to their infant's attachment cues in the Strange Situation Procedure, the likelihood of clinical referral by service providers was increased by 50%."

There is an extensive body of research demonstrating a significant association between attachment organizations and children's functioning across multiple domains. Early insecure attachment does not necessarily predict difficulties, but it is a liability for the child, particularly if similar parental behaviours continue throughout childhood. Compared to that of securely attached children, the adjustment of insecure children in many spheres of life is not as soundly based, putting their future relationships in jeopardy. Although the link is not fully established by research and there are other influences besides attachment, secure infants are more likely to become socially competent than their insecure peers. Relationships formed with peers influence the acquisition of social skills, intellectual development and the formation of social identity. Classification of children's peer status (popular, neglected or rejected) has been found to predict subsequent adjustment. Insecure children, particularly avoidant children, are especially vulnerable to family risk. Their social and behavioural problems increase or decline with deterioration or improvement in parenting. However, an early secure attachment appears to have a lasting protective function. As with attachment to parental figures, subsequent experiences may alter the course of development.

Studies have suggested that infants with a high-risk for autism spectrum disorders (ASD) may express attachment security differently from infants with a low-risk for ASD. Behavioural problems and social competence in insecure children increase or decline with deterioration or improvement in quality of parenting and the degree of risk in the family environment.

Some authors have questioned the idea that a taxonomy of categories representing a qualitative difference in attachment relationships can be developed. Examination of data from 1,139 15-month-olds showed that variation in attachment patterns was continuous rather than grouped. This criticism introduces important questions for attachment typologies and the mechanisms behind apparent types. However, it has relatively little relevance for attachment theory itself, which "neither requires nor predicts discrete patterns of attachment."

There is some evidence that gender differences in attachment patterns of adaptive significance begin to emerge in middle childhood. There has been a common tendency observed by researchers that males demonstrate a greater tendency to engage in criminal behavior which is suspected to be related to males being more likely to experience inadequate early attachments to primary caregivers Insecure attachment and early psychosocial stress indicate the presence of environmental risk (for example poverty, mental illness, instability, minority status, violence). Environmental risk can cause insecure attachment, while also favouring the development of strategies for earlier reproduction. Different reproductive strategies have different adaptive values for males and females: Insecure males tend to adopt avoidant strategies, whereas insecure females tend to adopt anxious/ambivalent strategies, unless they are in a very high risk environment. Adrenarche is proposed as the endocrine mechanism underlying the reorganization of insecure attachment in middle childhood.

Changes in attachment during childhood and adolescence
Childhood and adolescence allows the development of an internal working model useful for forming attachments. This internal working model is related to the individual's state of mind which develops with respect to attachment generally and explores how attachment functions in relationship dynamics based on childhood and adolescent experience. The organization of an internal working model is generally seen as leading to more stable attachments in those who develop such a model, rather than those who rely more on the individual's state of mind alone in forming new attachments.

Age, cognitive growth, and continued social experience advance the development and complexity of the internal working model. Attachment-related behaviours lose some characteristics typical of the infant-toddler period and take on age-related tendencies. The preschool period involves the use of negotiation and bargaining. For example, four-year-olds are not distressed by separation if they and their caregiver have already negotiated a shared plan for the separation and reunion.

Ideally, these social skills become incorporated into the internal working model to be used with other children and later with adult peers. As children move into the school years at about six years old, most develop a goal-corrected partnership with parents, in which each partner is willing to compromise in order to maintain a gratifying relationship. By middle childhood, the goal of the attachment behavioural system has changed from proximity to the attachment figure to availability. Generally, a child is content with longer separations, provided contact—or the possibility of physically reuniting, if needed—is available. Attachment behaviours such as clinging and following decline and self-reliance increases. By middle childhood (ages 7–11), there may be a shift toward mutual coregulation of secure-base contact in which caregiver and child negotiate methods of maintaining communication and supervision as the child moves toward a greater degree of independence.

The attachment system used by adolescents is seen as a "safety regulating system" whose main function is to promote physical and psychological safety. There are 2 different events that can trigger the attachment system. Those triggers include, the presence of a potential danger or stress, internal and external, and a threat of accessibility and/or availability of an attachment figure. The ultimate goal of the attachment system is security, so during a time of danger or inaccessibility the behavioural system accepts felt security in the context of the availability of protection. By adolescence we are able to find security through a variety of things, such as food, exercise, and social media. Felt security can be achieved through a number of ways, and often without the physical presence of the attachment figure. Higher levels of maturity allows adolescent teens to more capably interact with their environment on their own because the environment is perceived as less threatening. Adolescents teens will also see an increase in cognitive, emotional and behavioural maturity that dictates whether or not teens are less likely to experience conditions that activate their need for an attachment figure. For example, when teenagers get sick and stay home from school, surely they want their parents to be home so they can take care of them, but they are also able to stay home by themselves without experiencing serious amounts of distress. Additionally, the social environment that a school fosters impacts adolescents attachment behavior, even if these same adolescents have not had issues with attachment behavior previously. High schools that have a permissive environment compared to an authoritative environment promote positive attachment behavior. For example, when students feel connected to their teachers and peers because of their permissive schooling environment, they are less likely to skip school. Positive-attachment behavior in high schools have important implications on how a school's environment should be structured.

Here are the attachment style differences during adolescence:

 Secure adolescents are expected to hold their mothers at a higher rate than all other support figures, including father, significant others, and best friends.
 Insecure adolescents identify more strongly with their peers than their parents as their primary attachment figures. Their friends are seen as a significantly strong source of attachment support.
 Dismissing adolescents rate their parents as a less significant source of attachment support and would consider themselves as their primary attachment figure.
 Preoccupied adolescents would rate their parents as their primary source of attachment support and would consider themselves as a much less significant source of attachment support.

Attachment styles in adults

Attachment theory was extended to adult romantic relationships in the late 1980s by Cindy Hazan and Phillip Shaver. Four styles of attachment have been identified in adults: secure, anxious-preoccupied, dismissive-avoidant and fearful-avoidant. These roughly correspond to infant classifications: secure, insecure-ambivalent, insecure-avoidant and disorganized/disoriented.

Securely attached 

Securely attached adults have been "linked to a high need for achievement and a low fear of failure (Elliot & Reis, 2003)". They will positively approach a task with the goal of mastering it and have an appetite for exploration in achievement settings (Elliot & Reis, 2003). Research shows that securely attached adults have a "low level of personal distress and high levels of concern for others". Due to their high rates of self-efficacy, securely attached adults typically do not hesitate to remove a person having a negative impact from problematic situations they are facing. This calm response is representative of the securely attached adult's emotionally regulated response to threats that many studies have supported in the face of diverse situations. Adult secure attachment comes from an individual's early connection with their caregiver(s), genes and their romantic experiences.

Within romantic relationships, a securely attached adult will appear in the following ways: excellent conflict resolution, mentally flexible, effective communicators, avoidance of manipulation, comfortable with closeness without fearfulness of being enmeshed, quickly forgiving, viewing sex and emotional intimacy as one, believing they can positively impact their relationship, and caring for their partner in the way they want to be cared for. In summation, they are great partners who treat their spouses very well, as they are not afraid to give positively and ask for their needs to be met. Securely attached adults believe that there are "many potential partners that would be responsive to their needs", and if they come across an individual who is not meeting their needs, they will typically lose interest very quickly. In a study comparing secure-secure and secure-various attachment style relationships, there was no fluctuation in positive relational functioning. However, in any combination of two partners with attachment styles outside of secure, the relationships showed high levels of negative relationship functioning. This research indicates that it only takes one securely attached partner within a romantic relationship to maintain healthy, emotional relationship functioning.

Anxious-preoccupied 
Anxious-preoccupied adults seek high levels of intimacy, approval and responsiveness from partners, becoming overly dependent. They tend to be less trusting, have less positive views about themselves and their partners, and may exhibit high levels of emotional expressiveness, worry and impulsiveness in their relationships. The anxiety that adults feel prevents the establishment of satisfactory defense exclusion. Thus, it is possible that individuals that have been anxiously attached to their attachment figure or figures have not been able to develop sufficient defenses against separation anxiety. Because of their lack of preparation these individuals will then overreact to the anticipation of separation or the actual separation from their attachment figure. The anxiety comes from an individual's intense and/or unstable relationship that leaves the anxious or preoccupied individual relatively defenseless. Adults with this attachment style often project their anxieties onto otherwise benign social interactions, regardless of if the interaction is face-to-face or through a text-based medium such as instant messaging or email. Their thoughts and actions can lead to a painful cycle of self-fulfilling prophecies, possibly leading to self-sabotage.

Dismissive-avoidant 

Dismissive-avoidant adults desire a high level of independence, often appearing to avoid attachment altogether. They view themselves as self-sufficient, invulnerable to attachment feelings and not needing close relationships. They tend to suppress their feelings, dealing with conflict by distancing themselves from partners of whom they often have a poor opinion. Adults lack the interest of forming close relationships and maintaining emotional closeness with the people around them. They have a great amount of distrust in others but at the same time possess a positive model of self, they would prefer to invest in their own ego skills. Because of their distrust they cannot be convinced that other people have the ability to deliver emotional support. They try to create high levels of self-esteem by investing disproportionately in their abilities or accomplishments. These adults maintain their positive views of self, based on their personal achievements and competence rather than searching for and feeling acceptance from others. These adults will explicitly reject or minimize the importance of emotional attachment and passively avoid relationships when they feel as though they are becoming too close. They strive for self-reliance and independence. When it comes to the opinions of others about themselves, they are very indifferent and are relatively hesitant to positive feedback from their peers. Dismissive avoidance can also be explained as the result of defensive deactivation of the attachment system to avoid potential rejection, or genuine disregard for interpersonal closeness.

Fearful-avoidant 

Fearful-avoidant adults have mixed feelings about close relationships, both desiring and feeling uncomfortable with emotional closeness. The dangerous part about the contrast between wanting to form social relationships while simultaneously fearing the relationship is that it creates mental instability. This mental instability then translates into mistrusting the relationships they do form and also viewing themselves as unworthy. Furthermore, fearful-avoidant adults also have a less pleasant outlook on life compared to anxious-preoccupied and dismissive avoidant groups.  Like dismissive-avoidant adults, fearful-avoidant adults tend to seek less intimacy, suppressing their feelings.

Relationships involving people with  different attachment styles 

Attachment styles are activated from the first date onwards and impact relationship dynamics and how a relationship ends. Secure attachment has been shown to allow for better conflict resolution in a relationship and for one's ability to exit an unsatisfying relationship compared to other attachment types.  Secure individuals' authentic high self-esteem and positive view of others allows for this as they are confident that they will find another relationship.  Secure attachment has also shown to allow for the successful processing of relational losses (e.g. death, rejection, infidelity, abandonment etc.)  Attachment has also been shown to impact caregiving behavior in relationships (Shaver & Cassidy, 2018).

Assessing and measuring attachment 

Two main aspects of adult attachment have been studied. The organization and stability of the mental working models that underlie the attachment styles is explored by social psychologists interested in romantic attachment. Developmental psychologists interested in the individual's state of mind with respect to attachment generally explore how attachment functions in relationship dynamics and impacts relationship outcomes. The organization of mental working models is more stable while the individual's state of mind with respect to attachment fluctuates more. Some authors have suggested that adults do not hold a single set of working models. Instead, on one level they have a set of rules and assumptions about attachment relationships in general. On another level they hold information about specific relationships or relationship events. Information at different levels need not be consistent. Individuals can therefore hold different internal working models for different relationships.

There are a number of different measures of adult attachment, the most common being self-report questionnaires and coded interviews based on the Adult Attachment Interview. The various measures were developed primarily as research tools, for different purposes and addressing different domains, for example romantic relationships, platonic relationships, parental relationships or peer relationships. Some classify an adult's state of mind with respect to attachment and attachment patterns by reference to childhood experiences, while others assess relationship behaviours and security regarding parents and peers.

Associations of adult attachment with other traits 

Adult attachment styles are related to individual differences in the ways in which adults experience and manage their emotions. Recent meta-analyses link insecure attachment styles to lower emotional intelligence and lower trait mindfulness.

History

Maternal deprivation

The early thinking of the object relations school of psychoanalysis, particularly Melanie Klein, influenced Bowlby. However, he profoundly disagreed with the prevalent psychoanalytic belief that infants' responses relate to their internal fantasy life rather than real-life events. As Bowlby formulated his concepts, he was influenced by case studies on disturbed and delinquent children, such as those of William Goldfarb published in 1943 and 1945.

Bowlby's contemporary René Spitz observed separated children's grief, proposing that "psychotoxic" results were brought about by inappropriate experiences of early care. A strong influence was the work of social worker and psychoanalyst James Robertson who filmed the effects of separation on children in hospital. He and Bowlby collaborated in making the 1952 documentary film A Two-Year Old Goes to the Hospital which was instrumental in a campaign to alter hospital restrictions on visits by parents.

In his 1951 monograph for the World Health Organization, Maternal Care and Mental Health, Bowlby put forward the hypothesis that "the infant and young child should experience a warm, intimate, and continuous relationship with his mother in which both find satisfaction and enjoyment", the lack of which may have significant and irreversible mental health consequences. This was also published as Child Care and the Growth of Love for public consumption. The central proposition was influential but highly controversial. At the time there was limited empirical data and no comprehensive theory to account for such a conclusion. Nevertheless, Bowlby's theory sparked considerable interest in the nature of early relationships, giving a strong impetus to, (in the words of Mary Ainsworth), a "great body of research" in an extremely difficult, complex area.

Bowlby's work (and Robertson's films) caused a virtual revolution in a hospital visiting by parents, hospital provision for children's play, educational and social needs, and the use of residential nurseries. Over time, orphanages were abandoned in favour of foster care or family-style homes in most developed countries.

Bowlby's work about parental provisions after child birth implicates that maternal deprivation negatively influences the attachment behavior trajectory of a child's life. If a mother experiences post-partum anxiety, stress, or depression, the attachment they have with their child can be disrupted. It is important for pregnant women to have mental-health support pre and post-partum because mental illness often results in low feelings of attachment to their infant.

Formulation of the theory
Following the publication of Maternal Care and Mental Health, Bowlby sought new understanding from the fields of evolutionary biology, ethology, developmental psychology, cognitive science and control systems theory. He formulated the innovative proposition that mechanisms underlying an infant's emotional tie to the caregiver(s) emerged as a result of evolutionary pressure. He set out to develop a theory of motivation and behaviour control built on science rather than Freud's psychic energy model. Bowlby argued that with attachment theory he had made good the "deficiencies of the data and the lack of theory to link alleged cause and effect" of Maternal Care and Mental Health.

Ethology
Bowlby's attention was drawn to ethology in the early 1950s when he read Konrad Lorenz's work.  Other important influences were ethologists Nikolaas Tinbergen and Robert Hinde. Bowlby subsequently collaborated with Hinde. In 1953 Bowlby stated "the time is ripe for a unification of psychoanalytic concepts with those of ethology, and to pursue the rich vein of research which this union suggests." Konrad Lorenz had examined the phenomenon of "imprinting", a behaviour characteristic of some birds and mammals which involves rapid learning of recognition by the young, of a conspecific or comparable object. After recognition comes a tendency to follow.

Certain types of learning are possible, respective to each applicable type of learning, only within a limited age range known as a critical period. Bowlby's concepts included the idea that attachment involved learning from experience during a limited age period, influenced by adult behaviour. He did not apply the imprinting concept in its entirety to human attachment. However, he considered that attachment behaviour was best explained as instinctive, combined with the effect of experience, stressing the readiness the child brings to social interactions. Over time it became apparent there were more differences than similarities between attachment theory and imprinting so the analogy was dropped.

Ethologists expressed concern about the adequacy of some research on which attachment theory was based, particularly the generalization to humans from animal studies. Schur, discussing Bowlby's use of ethological concepts (pre-1960) commented that concepts used in attachment theory had not kept up with changes in ethology itself. Ethologists and others writing in the 1960s and 1970s questioned and expanded the types of behaviour used as indications of attachment. Observational studies of young children in natural settings provided other behaviours that might indicate attachment; for example, staying within a predictable distance of the mother without effort on her part and picking up small objects, bringing them to the mother but not to others. Although ethologists tended to be in agreement with Bowlby, they pressed for more data, objecting to psychologists writing as if there were an "entity which is 'attachment', existing over and above the observable measures." Robert Hinde considered "attachment behaviour system" to be an appropriate term which did not offer the same problems "because it refers to postulated control systems that determine the relations between different kinds of behaviour."

Psychoanalysis

Psychoanalytic concepts influenced Bowlby's view of attachment, in particular, the observations by Anna Freud and Dorothy Burlingham of young children separated from familiar caregivers during World War II. However, Bowlby rejected psychoanalytical explanations for early infant bonds including "drive theory" in which the motivation for attachment derives from gratification of hunger and libidinal drives. He called this the "cupboard-love" theory of relationships. In his view it failed to see attachment as a psychological bond in its own right rather than an instinct derived from feeding or sexuality. Based on ideas of primary attachment and Neo-Darwinism, Bowlby identified what he saw as fundamental flaws in psychoanalysis: the overemphasis of internal dangers rather than external threat, and the view of the development of personality via linear phases with regression to fixed points accounting for psychological distress. Bowlby instead posited that several lines of development were possible, the outcome of which depended on the interaction between the organism and the environment. In attachment this would mean that although a developing child has a propensity to form attachments, the nature of those attachments depends on the environment to which the child is exposed.

From early in the development of attachment theory there was criticism of the theory's lack of congruence with various branches of psychoanalysis. Bowlby's decisions left him open to criticism from well-established thinkers working on similar problems.

Internal working model
The philosopher Kenneth Craik had noted the ability of thought to predict events. He stressed the survival value of natural selection for this ability. A key component of attachment theory is the attachment behaviour system where certain behaviours have a predictable outcome (i.e. proximity) and serve as self-preservation method (i.e. protection). All taking place outside of an individuals awareness,  This internal working model allows a person to try out alternatives mentally, using knowledge of the past while responding to the present and future. Bowlby applied Craik's ideas to attachment, when other psychologists were applying these concepts to adult perception and cognition.

Infants absorb all sorts of complex social-emotional information from the social interactions that they observe. They notice the helpful and hindering behaviours of one person to another. From these observations they develop expectations of how two characters should behave, known as a "secure base script." These scripts provide as a template of how attachment related events should unfold and they are the building blocks of ones internal working models.  infant's internal working model is developed in response to the infant's experience based internal working models of self, and environment, with emphasis on the caregiving environment and the outcomes of his or her proximity-seeking behaviours. Theoretically, secure child and adult script, would allow for an attachment situation where one person successfully utilizes another as a secure base from which to explore and as a safe haven in times of distress. In contrast, insecure individuals would create attachment situations with more complications. For example, If the caregiver is accepting of these proximity-seeking behaviours and grants access, the infant develops a secure organization; if the caregiver consistently denies the infant access, an avoidant organization develops; and if the caregiver inconsistently grants access, an ambivalent organization develops. In retrospect, internal working models are constant with and reflect the primary relationship with our caregivers. Childhood attachment directly influences our adult relationships.

A parent's internal working model that is operative in the attachment relationship with her infant can be accessed by examining the parent's mental representations. Recent research has demonstrated that the quality of maternal attributions as markers of maternal mental representations can be associated with particular forms of maternal psychopathology and can be altered in a relative short time-period by targeted psychotherapeutic intervention.

Cybernetics
The theory of control systems (cybernetics), developing during the 1930s and 1940s, influenced Bowlby's thinking. The young child's need for proximity to the attachment figure was seen as balancing homeostatically with the need for exploration. (Bowlby compared this process to physiological homeostasis whereby, for example, blood pressure is kept within limits). The actual distance maintained by the child would vary as the balance of needs changed. For example, the approach of a stranger, or an injury, would cause the child exploring at a distance to seek proximity. The child's goal is not an object (the caregiver) but a state; maintenance of the desired distance from the caregiver depending on circumstances.

Cognitive development
Bowlby's reliance on Piaget's theory of cognitive development gave rise to questions about object permanence (the ability to remember an object that is temporarily absent) in early attachment behaviours. An infant's ability to discriminate strangers and react to the mother's absence seemed to occur months earlier than Piaget suggested would be cognitively possible. More recently, it has been noted that the understanding of mental representation has advanced so much since Bowlby's day that present views can be more specific than those of Bowlby's time.

Behaviourism
In 1969, Gerwitz discussed how mother and child could provide each other with positive reinforcement experiences through their mutual attention, thereby learning to stay close together. This explanation would make it unnecessary to posit innate human characteristics fostering attachment. Learning theory, (behaviourism), saw attachment as a remnant of dependency with the quality of attachment being merely a response to the caregiver's cues. The main predictors of attachment quality are parents being sensitive and responsive to their children. When parents interact with their infants in a warm and nurturing manner, their attachment quality increases. The way that parents interact with their children at four months is related to attachment behavior at 12 months, thus it is important for parents' sensitivity and responsiveness to remain stable. The lack of sensitivity and responsiveness increases the likelihood for attachment disorders to development in children. Behaviourists saw behaviours like crying as a random activity meaning nothing until reinforced by a caregiver's response. To behaviourists, frequent responses would result in more crying. To attachment theorists, crying is an inborn attachment behaviour to which the caregiver must respond if the infant is to develop emotional security. Conscientious responses produce security which enhances autonomy and results in less crying. Ainsworth's research in Baltimore supported the attachment theorists' view.

In the last decade, behaviour analysts have constructed models of attachment based on the importance of contingent relationships. These behaviour analytic models have received some support from research and meta-analytic reviews.

Developments since 1970s
In the 1970s, problems with viewing attachment as a trait (stable characteristic of an individual) rather than as a type of behaviour with organizing functions and outcomes, led some authors to the conclusion that attachment behaviours were best understood in terms of their functions in the child's life. This way of thinking saw the secure base concept as central to attachment theory's logic, coherence, and status as an organizational construct. Following this argument, the assumption that attachment is expressed identically in all humans cross-culturally was examined. The research showed that though there were cultural differences, the three basic patterns, secure, avoidant and ambivalent, can be found in every culture in which studies have been undertaken, even where communal sleeping arrangements are the norm. The selection of the secure pattern is found in the majority of children across cultures studied. This follows logically from the fact that attachment theory provides for infants to adapt to changes in the environment, selecting optimal behavioural strategies. How attachment is expressed shows cultural variations which need to be ascertained before studies can be undertaken; for example Gusii infants are greeted with a handshake rather than a hug. Securely attached Gusii infants anticipate and seek this contact. There are also differences in the distribution of insecure patterns based on cultural differences in child-rearing practices. The scholar Michael Rutter in 1974 studied the importance of distinguishing between the consequences of attachment deprivation upon intellectual retardation in children and lack of development in the emotional growth in children. Rutter's conclusion was that a careful delineation of maternal attributes needed to be identified and differentiated for progress in the field to continue.

The biggest challenge to the notion of the universality of attachment theory came from studies conducted in Japan where the concept of amae plays a prominent role in describing family relationships. Arguments revolved around the appropriateness of the use of the Strange Situation procedure where amae is practiced. Ultimately research tended to confirm the universality hypothesis of attachment theory. Most recently a 2007 study conducted in Sapporo in Japan found attachment distributions consistent with global norms using the six-year Main and Cassidy scoring system for attachment classification.

Critics in the 1990s such as J. R. Harris, Steven Pinker and Jerome Kagan were generally concerned with the concept of infant determinism (nature versus nurture), stressing the effects of later experience on personality. Building on the work on temperament of Stella Chess, Kagan rejected almost every assumption on which attachment theory's cause was based. Kagan argued that heredity was far more important than the transient developmental effects of early environment. For example, a child with an inherently difficult temperament would not elicit sensitive behavioural responses from a caregiver. The debate spawned considerable research and analysis of data from the growing number of longitudinal studies. Subsequent research has not borne out Kagan's argument, possibly suggesting that it is the caregiver's behaviours that form the child's attachment style, although how this style is expressed may differ with the child's temperament. Harris and Pinker put forward the notion that the influence of parents had been much exaggerated, arguing that socialization took place primarily in peer groups. H. Rudolph Schaffer concluded that parents and peers had different functions, fulfilling distinctive roles in children's development.

Psychoanalyst/psychologists Peter Fonagy and Mary Target have attempted to bring attachment theory and psychoanalysis into a closer relationship through cognitive science as mentalization. Mentalization, or theory of mind, is the capacity of human beings to guess with some accuracy what thoughts, emotions and intentions lie behind behaviours as subtle as facial expression. It has been speculated that this connection between theory of mind and the internal working model may open new areas of study, leading to alterations in attachment theory. Since the late 1980s, there has been a developing rapprochement between attachment theory and psychoanalysis, based on common ground as elaborated by attachment theorists and researchers, and a change in what psychoanalysts consider to be central to psychoanalysis. Object relations models which emphasise the autonomous need for a relationship have become dominant and are linked to a growing recognition in psychoanalysis of the importance of infant development in the context of relationships and internalized representations. Psychoanalysis has recognized the formative nature of a child's early environment including the issue of childhood trauma. A psychoanalytically based exploration of the attachment system and an accompanying clinical approach has emerged together with a recognition of the need for measurement of outcomes of interventions.

One focus of attachment research has been the difficulties of children whose attachment history was poor, including those with extensive non-parental child care experiences. Concern with the effects of child care was intense during the so-called "day care wars" of the late-20th century, during which some authors stressed the deleterious effects of day care. As a result of this controversy, training of child care professionals has come to stress attachment issues, including the need for relationship-building by the assignment of a child to a specific care-giver. Although only high-quality child care settings are likely to provide this, more infants in child care receive attachment-friendly care than in the past. A natural experiment permitted extensive study of attachment issues as researchers followed thousands of Romanian orphans adopted into Western families after the end of the Nicolae Ceaușescu regime. The English and Romanian Adoptees Study Team, led by Michael Rutter, followed some of the children into their teens, attempting to unravel the effects of poor attachment, adoption, new relationships, physical problems and medical issues associated with their early lives. Studies of these adoptees, whose initial conditions were shocking, yielded reason for optimism as many of the children developed quite well. Researchers noted that separation from familiar people is only one of many factors that help to determine the quality of development. Although higher rates of atypical insecure attachment patterns were found compared to native-born or early-adopted samples, 70% of later-adopted children exhibited no marked or severe attachment disorder behaviours.

Authors considering attachment in non-Western cultures have noted the connection of attachment theory with Western family and child care patterns characteristic of Bowlby's time. As children's experience of care changes, so may attachment-related experiences. For example, changes in attitudes toward female sexuality have greatly increased the numbers of children living with their never-married mothers or being cared for outside the home while the mothers work. This social change has made it more difficult for childless people to adopt infants in their own countries. There has been an increase in the number of older-child adoptions and adoptions from third-world sources in first-world countries. Adoptions and births to same-sex couples have increased in number and gained legal protection, compared to their status in Bowlby's time. Regardless of whether parents are genetically related, adoptive parents attachment roles they will still influence and affect their child's attachment behaviors throughout their lifetime. Issues have been raised to the effect that the dyadic model characteristic of attachment theory cannot address the complexity of real-life social experiences, as infants often have multiple relationships within the family and in child care settings. It is suggested these multiple relationships influence one another reciprocally, at least within a family.

Principles of attachment theory have been used to explain adult social behaviours, including mating, social dominance and hierarchical power structures, in-group identification, group coalitions, membership in cults and totalitarian systems and negotiation of reciprocity and justice. Those explanations have been used to design parental care training, and have been particularly successful in the design of child abuse prevention programmes.

While a wide variety of studies have upheld the basic tenets of attachment theory, research has been inconclusive as to whether self-reported early attachment and later depression are demonstrably related.

Neurobiology of attachment
In addition to longitudinal studies, there has been psychophysiological research on the neurobiology of attachment. Research has begun to include neural development, behaviour genetics and temperament concepts. Generally, temperament and attachment constitute separate developmental domains, but aspects of both contribute to a range of interpersonal and intrapersonal developmental outcomes. Some types of temperament may make some individuals susceptible to the stress of unpredictable or hostile relationships with caregivers in the early years. In the absence of available and responsive caregivers it appears that some children are particularly vulnerable to developing attachment disorders.

The quality of caregiving received at infancy and childhood directly affects an individual's neurological systems which controls stress regulation. In psychophysiological research on attachment, the two main areas studied have been autonomic responses, such as heart rate or respiration, and the activity of the hypothalamic–pituitary–adrenal axis, a system that is responsible for the body's reaction to stress. Infants' physiological responses have been measured during the Strange Situation procedure looking at individual differences in infant temperament and the extent to which attachment acts as a moderator. Recent studies convey that early attachment relationships become molecularly instilled into the being, thus affecting later immune system functioning. Empirical evidence communicates that early negative experiences produce pro inflammatory phenotype cells in the immune system, which is directly related to cardiovascular disease, autoimmune diseases, and certain types of cancer.

Recent improvements involving methods of research have enabled researchers to further investigate the neural correlates of attachment in humans. These advances include identifying key brain structures, neural circuits, neurotransmitter systems, and neuropeptides, and how they are involved in attachment system functioning and can indicate more about a certain individual, even predict their behaviour. There is initial evidence that caregiving and attachment involve both unique and overlapping brain regions. Another issue is the role of inherited genetic factors in shaping attachments: for example one type of polymorphism of the gene coding for the D2 dopamine receptor has been linked to anxious attachment and another in the gene for the 5-HT2A serotonin receptor with avoidant attachment.

Studies show that attachment in adulthood is simultaneously related to biomarkers of immunity. For example, individuals with an avoidance attachment style produce higher levels of the pro inflammatory cytokine interleukin-6 (IL-6) when reacting to an interpersonal stressor, while individuals representing an anxious attachment style tend to have elevated cortisol production and lower numbers of T cells. Although children vary genetically and each individual requires different attachment relationships, there is consistent evidence that maternal warmth during infancy and childhood creates a safe haven for individuals resulting in superior immune system functioning. One theoretical basis for this is that it makes biological sense for children to vary in their susceptibility to rearing influence.

Crime 
Attachment theory has often been applied in the discipline of criminology. It has been used in an attempt to identify causal mechanisms in criminal behaviour – with uses ranging from offender profiling, better understanding types of offence and the pursuit of preventative policy. It has been found that disturbances early on in child-caregiver relationships are a risk factor in criminality. Attachment theory in this context has been described as "perhaps the most influential of contemporary psychoanalytically oriented theories of crime".

History 
In the 1870s, Cesare Lombroso's "born criminal" theory, which posited that criminality was innate and inherited, had dominated thinking in criminology. The introduction of attachment theory in criminal theory created a shift away from seeing an individual as being "genetically doomed" to criminality, to instead studying criminal behaviour from a developmental perspective.

The origins of attachment theory within criminology can be found in the work of August Aichhorn. In applying psychoanalysis to pedagogy, he argued that abnormal child development stemming from relationship difficulties underlies many instances of delinquency. He believed that within insecure child-parent relationships, socialization may go awry, causing an arrest in the child's development allowing latent delinquency to become dominant.

The intersection of crime and attachment theory was further researched by John Bowlby. In his first published work, Forty-four Juvenile Thieves, he studied a sample of 88 children (44 juvenile thieves and 44 non-delinquent controls) to investigate the home life experiences of these two groups. It was identified that child-mother separation was a causative factor in delinquent character formation, particularly in the development of an "affectionless character" often seen in the persistent offender. 17 of the juvenile thieves had been separated from their mothers for longer than six months during their first five years, and only 2 children from the control group had such a separation. He also found that 14 of the thieves were "affectionless characters" distinguishing them from others by their lack of affection, no emotional ties, no real friendships, and having "no roots in their relationships". He wrote:

These 'affectionless' delinquents were children who, in the first 12 months of life, either had formed a bond with their mother which had subsequently been disrupted, or failed to form a bond at all. 14 of the 17 affectionless delinquents had experienced multiple moves between caregivers. Amongst the control group, there were no affectionless characters. He also noted that delinquents of an 'Affectionless Character' were far more likely to steal in a persistent and serious way than are delinquents of other types.

Age distribution of crime 
The relationship between age and crime is one of the most replicated findings in criminology. It has been named "one of the brute facts of criminology" claiming that "no fact about crime is more widely accepted."  It has shown that the prevalence of offending increases during adolescence, peaks around the late teenage years and early twenties, and subsequently decreases sharply.  Whilst the age-crime curve is regarded as fact, the mechanisms driving it are largely disputed.

The two main theories, developmental theory and life-course theory, have attachment theory in their origin. Developmental perspectives place importance on the role of childhood experiences, and argue that this can determine criminal patterns later on i.e. individuals who have disrupted childhood attachments, amongst other factors, will have criminal careers that continue long into adulthood. Life course perspectives do not entirely deny the importance of childhood experiences, but argue that developmental theory is too deterministic in nature. Instead they argue that because humans have agency, every stage of the life course matters. Early childhood experiences remain important, albeit within a framework of cumulative disadvantage, and attachments later on in life can determine whether an individual will be likely to offend or not.

Developmental perspectives 
The developmental perspective aims to explain the age-crime curve by two qualitatively distinct types of people and their behavioural trajectories; adolescence-limited (those who start their criminal career in adolescence and desist from crime before adulthood) and life-course persistent (those who begin anti-social behaviour in adolescence and continue this criminal behaviour into adulthood).

Attachment theory has been used to identify differences between these two trajectories. Life-course persistent offenders start with disrupted attachment relationships in their childhood, which drives a disordered personality and long term antisocial behaviours and criminal careers. By contrast, adolescence-limited offenders do not have disrupted family bonds and are described as having healthy pre-delinquent development.

Life-course perspectives 
The life-course perspective argues that individuals are not automatically assigned to a category in a dual taxonomy. Instead, there are within-individual changes in criminality, due to human agency. Individuals who have insecure attachment styles in childhood can therefore later create meaningful social ties and thereby desist from crime, allowing changes to criminality at different stages in the life course.

Types of offenses 
Since early childhood relationships can influence interpersonal relationships throughout the lifespan, attachment theory has been applied in research into particular crimes, particularly those which tend to occur within close relational ties.

Disrupted attachment patterns from childhood have been identified as a risk factor for domestic violence. These disruptions in childhood can prevent the formation of a secure attachment relationship, and in turn adversely affecting a healthy way to deal with stress. In adulthood, lack of coping mechanisms can result in intense conflict resulting in violent behaviour. Bowlby's theory of functional anger states that children signal to their caregiver that their attachment needs are not being met by use of angry behaviour. This has been extended to theorize why domestic violence occurs; an adult with consistent experience of insecure attachment may use physical violence to express their attachment needs not being met by their partners. This perception of low support from partner has been identified as a strong predictor of male violence.  Other predictors have been named as perceived deficiency in maternal love in childhood, low self-esteem. It has also been found that individuals with a dismissive attachment style, often seen in an antisocial/narcissistic-narcissistic subtype of offender, tend to be emotionally abusive as well as violent. Individuals in the borderline/emotionally dependent subtype have traits which originate from insecure attachment in childhood, and tend to have high levels of anger.

It has been found that sexual offenders have significantly less secure maternal and paternal attachments compared with non-offenders which suggests that insecure attachments in infancy persist into adulthood. In a recent study, 57% of sexual offenders were found to be of a preoccupied attachment style. There is also evidence that suggests subtypes of sexual crime can have different attachment styles. Dismissive individuals tend to be hostile towards others, and are more likely to offend violently against adult women. By contrast, child abusers are more likely to have preoccupied attachment styles as the tendency to seek approval from others becomes distorted and attachment relationships become sexualized.

Practical applications
As a theory of socioemotional development, attachment theory has implications and practical applications in social policy, decisions about the care and welfare of children and mental health.

Child care policies
Social policies concerning the care of children were the driving force in Bowlby's development of attachment theory. The difficulty lies in applying attachment concepts to policy and practice. In 2008 C.H. Zeanah and colleagues stated, "Supporting early child-parent relationships is an increasingly prominent goal of mental health practitioners, community-based service providers and policy makers ... Attachment theory and research have generated important findings concerning early child development and spurred the creation of programs to support early child-parent relationships." Additionally, practitioners can use the concepts of attachment theory that suggests deep relationships which builds attachment security towards mental health interventions. Attachment security has been found to strengthen one's ability to cope with stress, anxiety, and maintain that, in turn, can contribute to the person's well-being and mental health For example,  previous studies have demonstrated that individuals who demonstrate avoidance attachment styles experiences less stress and distress when presented with ostracism. However, finding quality childcare while at work or school is an issue for many families. NIHD recent study convey that top notch day care contributes to secure attachment relationships in children.

People have commented on this matter stating that "legislative initiatives reflecting higher standards for credentialing and licensing childcare workers, requiring education in child development and attachment theory, and at least a two-year associate degree course as well as salary increases and increased stature for childcare positions". Corporations should implement more flexible work arrangements that recognize child care as essential for all its employees. This includes re-examination of parental leave policies. Too many parents are forced to return to work too soon post childbirth because of company policy or financial necessity. No matter the reason this inhibits early parent child bonding. In addition to this, there should be increased attention to the training and screening of childcare workers. In his article reviewing attachment theory, Sweeney suggested, among several policy implications, "legislative initiatives reflecting higher standards for credentialing and licensing childcare workers, requiring education in child development and attachment theory, and at least a two-year associate degree course as well as salary increases and increased stature for childcare positions".

Historically, attachment theory had significant policy implications for hospitalized or institutionalized children, and those in poor quality daycare. Controversy remains over whether non-maternal care, particularly in group settings, has deleterious effects on social development. It is plain from research that poor quality care carries risks but that those who experience good quality alternative care cope well although it is difficult to provide good quality, individualized care in group settings.

Attachment theory has implications in residence and contact disputes, and applications by foster parents to adopt foster children. In the past, particularly in North America, the main theoretical framework was psychoanalysis. Increasingly attachment theory has replaced it, thus focusing on the quality and continuity of caregiver relationships rather than economic well-being or automatic precedence of any one party, such as the biological mother. Rutter noted that in the UK, since 1980, family courts have shifted considerably to recognize the complications of attachment relationships. Children tend to have attachment relationships with both parents and often grandparents or other relatives. Judgements need to take this into account along with the impact of step-families. Attachment theory has been crucial in highlighting the importance of social relationships in dynamic rather than fixed terms.

Attachment theory can also inform decisions made in social work, especially in humanistic social work (Petru Stefaroi), and court processes about foster care or other placements. Considering the child's attachment needs can help determine the level of risk posed by placement options. Within adoption, the shift from "closed" to "open" adoptions and the importance of the search for biological parents would be expected on the basis of attachment theory. Many researchers in the field were strongly influenced by it.

Clinical practice in children
Although attachment theory has become a major scientific theory of socioemotional development with one of the widest research lines in modern psychology, it has, until recently, been less used in clinical practice. The attachment theory focused on the attention of the child when the mother is there and the responses that the child shows when the mother leaves, which indicated the attachment and bonding of the mother and the child. The attention therapy is the done while the child is being restrained by the therapists and the responses displayed were noted. The tests were done to show the responses of the child.

This may be partly due to lack of attention paid to clinical application by Bowlby himself and partly due to broader meanings of the word 'attachment' used amongst practitioners. It may also be partly due to the mistaken association of attachment theory with the pseudoscientific interventions misleadingly known as "attachment therapy".

Prevention and treatment

In 1988, Bowlby published a series of lectures indicating how attachment theory and research could be used in understanding and treating child and family disorders. His focus for bringing about change was the parents' internal working models, parenting behaviours and the parents' relationship with the therapeutic intervenor. Ongoing research has led to a number of individual treatments and prevention and intervention programmes. In regards to personal development, children from all the age groups were tested to show the effectiveness of the theory that is being theorized by Bowlby. They range from individual therapy to public health programmes to interventions designed for foster caregivers. For infants and younger children, the focus is on increasing the responsiveness and sensitivity of the caregiver, or if that is not possible, placing the child with a different caregiver. An assessment of the attachment status or caregiving responses of the caregiver is invariably included, as attachment is a two-way process involving attachment behaviour and caregiver response. Some programmes are aimed at foster carers because the attachment behaviours of infants or children with attachment difficulties often do not elicit appropriate caregiver responses. Modern prevention and intervention programmes have proven successful.

Reactive attachment disorder and attachment disorder

One atypical attachment pattern is considered to be an actual disorder, known as reactive attachment disorder or RAD, which is a recognized psychiatric diagnosis (ICD-10 F94.1/2 and DSM-IV-TR 313.89). Against common misconception, this is not the same as 'disorganized attachment'. The essential feature of reactive attachment disorder is markedly disturbed and developmentally inappropriate social relatedness in most contexts that begins before age five years, associated with gross pathological care. There are two subtypes, one reflecting a disinhibited attachment pattern, the other an inhibited pattern. RAD is not a description of insecure attachment styles, however problematic those styles may be; instead, it denotes a lack of age-appropriate attachment behaviours that may appear to resemble a clinical disorder. Although the term "reactive attachment disorder" is now popularly applied to perceived behavioural difficulties that fall outside the DSM or ICD criteria, particularly on the Web and in connection with the pseudo-scientific attachment therapy, "true" RAD is thought to be rare.

"Attachment disorder" is an ambiguous term, which may refer to reactive attachment disorder or to the more problematic insecure attachment styles (although none of these are clinical disorders). It may also be used to refer to proposed new classification systems put forward by theorists in the field, and is used within attachment therapy as a form of unvalidated diagnosis. One of the proposed new classifications, "secure base distortion" has been found to be associated with caregiver traumatization.

Clinical practice in adults and families
As attachment theory offers a broad, far-reaching view of human functioning, it can enrich a therapist's understanding of patients and the therapeutic relationship rather than dictate a particular form of treatment. Some forms of psychoanalysis-based therapy for adults—within relational psychoanalysis and other approaches—also incorporate attachment theory and patterns.

Criticism
For attachment theory to be viable, it must be believed that attachment behaviour is strongly affected by one's environment.  A 2016 article from the Psychological Bulletin suggests that one's attachment could largely be due to heredity; hence, the authors point to the need to focus research on nonshared environmental effects, requiring "behavioral genetic designs that afford differentiating heritability from shared and nonshared environmental influences".  In an interview, Dr. Jerome Kagan also suggests that a child's behaviour is largely due to temperament, as well as social class and culture.  He further states, "Attachment is a far less popular explanation in 2019 than it was in the 1960s, and in 10 to 15 years, it's going to be rare to find anyone defending the theory. It's just dying out slowly...Yes, what happens to you in the first year or two of life has an effect, but it's tiny. If I take a 1-year-old child who is securely attached, and the parents die and the child is adopted by a cruel foster parent, that child is in trouble. Their secure attachment is useless. When you think about it, it's silly that after the first year you could predict with any confidence what this person is going to be like in 20 years. It's a ridiculous idea."

Attachment theory suggests the idea of an all-encompassing label to describe one person, but a 2013 study from Utah State suggests an individual can have different attachment styles in relation to different people.  The study further concludes, "The relationship between father-child and mother-child attachment was not significant. Likewise, the relationship between child temperament and parent-child attachment was not significant. Also, parents' time away from their child was not a significant predictor of attachment." Attachment theory models are based on stressful situations and it focuses heavily on attachment to the mother and doesn't value as much the attachments to other family members and peers.  Salvador Minuchin suggested that attachment theory's focus on the mother-child relation ignores the value in other familial influences: "The entire family—not just the mother or primary caretaker—including father, siblings, grandparents, often cousins, aunts and uncles, are extremely significant in the experience of the child...And yet, when I hear attachment theorists talk, I don't hear anything about these other important figures in a child's life."

In exploring the relationship between childhood attachment and romantic relationships, a 2013 study concluded, "The first variable of attachment to parent, compared to romantic partner, had a medium effect size. This would suggest that the attachment to a parent is occasionally associated to the attachment to romantic partner, but is not strongly correlated."  Additional variables comparing relationship quality/satisfaction, care/avoidance and alienation/anxiety fail to have strong correlations.

Attachment theory, some argue, represents a Western middle-class perspective, ignoring the diverse caregiving values and practices in most of the world.

See also 

Atlas personality
Attachment-based therapy (children)
Attachment measures
Attachment parenting
Attachment theory and psychology of religion
Fathers as attachment figures
Human bonding
Nurture kinship
Relationship Science

Citations

General and cited references

Further reading 

 
 

 
Adoption, fostering, orphan care and displacement
Ethology
Evolutionary biology
Evolutionary psychology
Human development
Interpersonal relationships
Object relations theory
Philosophy of love
Psychoanalytic theory